Mao Jie (died 216), courtesy name Xiaoxian, was an official serving under the warlord Cao Cao during the late Eastern Han dynasty of China. He was from Pingqiu County, Chenliu Commandery, which is located east of present-day Fengqiu County, Henan. On the recommendation of Man Chong, Mao Jie joined Cao Cao. Mao Jie was very skilled when it came to domestic policies promoting the prioritisation of agriculture.

See also
 Lists of people of the Three Kingdoms

References

 Chen, Shou (3rd century). Records of the Three Kingdoms (Sanguozhi).
 Pei, Songzhi (5th century). Annotations to Records of the Three Kingdoms (Sanguozhi zhu).

Year of birth unknown
2nd-century births
216 deaths
Officials under Cao Cao
Politicians from Xinxiang
Han dynasty politicians from Henan